Goodwood is an inner southern suburb of the city of Adelaide, South Australia. It neighbours the Royal Adelaide Showgrounds and features several churches in its commercial district. Its major precinct is Goodwood Road, which is home to many shops and businesses, as well as the local state school (Goodwood Primary School).

History
The original land surveyed of 1839 was granted to the South Australian Company and named Goodwood.  Two other sections of land had been sold to settler Thomas Hardy in May 1838, who sold it to his son, Arthur in 1841. The 1840 census shows that there was a Village of Goodwood with a population of 100, but the first registration of a contact for sale was not until 1846. In 1849, Arthur Hardy subdivided his property into a number of four acre blocks, naming it Goodwood Park. The Belair railway line also goes through the suburb as does the city to Glenelg tram line.

Governance
Goodwood is in the City of Unley local government area. It straddles the boundary of the state electorates of Ashford and Unley. It is in the federal Division of Adelaide. Its postcode is 5034.

See also
 Capri Theatre
 Forestville hockey club
 Electoral district of Goodwood
Goodwood Institute

References

External links
Stories from Goodwood Residents
Forestville Hockey Club

Suburbs of Adelaide
Populated places established in 1849
1849 establishments in Australia